5α-Dihydrodeoxycorticosterone (abbreviated as DHDOC), also known as 21-hydroxy-5α-pregnan-20-one, is an endogenous progestogen and neurosteroid. It is synthesized from the adrenal hormone deoxycorticosterone (DOC) by the enzyme 5α-reductase type I. DHDOC is an agonist of the progesterone receptor, as well as a positive allosteric modulator of the GABAA receptor, and is known to have anticonvulsant effects.

Chemistry

See also
 Tetrahydrodeoxycorticosterone (THDOC)
 5α-Dihydroprogesterone (DHP)
 Hydroxydione

References

Neurosteroids
Pregnanes
Progestogens
GABAA receptor positive allosteric modulators